Galaxiella toourtkoourt, known as the little galaxias (although it is not a true member of the genus Galaxias), is a species of fish in the family Galaxiidae. It is among the smallest galaxiid species known.

It is a freshwater fish native to Australia, where it ranges from the Barwon River basin near Barwon Downs in Victoria west to the Watervalley Wetlands near Coorong National Park in South Australia. The environments in which the species occurs are usually characterized by still or slow-flowing water and partial shade, and they may occasionally be slightly saline. 

It is often seen alongside other native fish species such as Nannoperca australis and Galaxias maculatus, crayfish belonging to the genera Engaeus and Geocharax, and the introduced eastern mosquitofish. Galaxiella toourtkoourt is a small fish, reaching  in total length.

Galaxiella toourtkoourt was described in 2015 by Rhys A. Coleman, Ary A. Hoffmann, and Tarmo A. Raadik based on distinct genetic and morphological characteristics that differentiate the species from its relative Galaxiella pusilla. Its specific epithet, toourtkoourt, is derived from indigenous languages such as the Djabwurrung language and reportedly means "little fish in freshwater".

References 

toourtkoourt
Fish described in 2015
Fish of Australia